Jarkent (Jarkent), formerly known as Panfilov (until 1991) and Dzharkent (until 1942), is a city which serves as the administrative center of Panfilov District in the Almaty Region, Kazakhstan. It is located near the Usek river, not far from the Ili river. The city's population totaled 42,617 as of 2019.

The town was founded in 1882 as Jarkent. From 1942 until 1991 it was named Panfilov after Ivan Panfilov, the Russian World War II hero who died in battle in 1941. Jarkent is well known for its nineteenth-century great mosque, commissioned by a wealthy merchant and community leader named Vali Bay. It is notable for its unique mix of Chinese and Central Asian styles of architecture.

Climate

Demographics 

The city's population stood at 42,617 as of 2019; and

References

Populated places in Almaty Region
Semirechye Oblast
Populated places established in 1882